Dávid Földházi (born 6 January 1995) is a Hungarian swimmer. He competed in the men's 200 metre backstroke event at the 2016 Summer Olympics.

References

External links
 

1995 births
Living people
Hungarian male swimmers
Olympic swimmers of Hungary
Swimmers at the 2016 Summer Olympics
Place of birth missing (living people)
Male backstroke swimmers